The following are lists of affiliates of the Univision television network:

List of Univision affiliates (by U.S. state)
List of Univision affiliates (table)

See also
List of UniMás affiliates
List of Telemundo affiliates